Annales de philosophie chrétienne was a monthly Catholic journal that existed from 1830 to 1913. It was founded by Augustin Bonnetty.

The journal was placed on the Index Librorum Prohibitorum on May 5, 1913, and ceased being published thereafter.

References

Further reading
 

Catholic magazines
Philosophy journals
Defunct newspapers published in France
Publications established in 1830
Publications disestablished in 1913
Modernism in the Catholic Church